Akio (written: , , , , , , , , , , , , , , , , ,  or  in hiragana) is a masculine Japanese given name. Notable people with the name include:

, Japanese manga artist
, Japanese politician
, Japanese mathematician
Akio Ishii (石井 昭男, born 1955), Japanese baseball player
, Japanese shogi player
, Japanese television and film director
, Japanese rower
, Japanese judoka
, Japanese optometrist
Akio Kanemoto (born 1945), Japanese golfer
, Japanese businessman and murder victim
, Japanese historian
, Japanese politician
, Japanese cyclist
, Japanese naval aviator
, Japanese businessman
Akio Minakami (born 1948), Japanese karateka
, Japanese baseball player
, Japanese physiologist and writer
, Japanese businessman
, Japanese writer
, Japanese table tennis player
, Japanese voice actor, actor and narrator
, Japanese actor and voice actor
, Japanese baseball player
, Japanese jazz guitarist
, Japanese figure skater
Akio Sato (disambiguation), multiple people
, Japanese boxer
, Japanese field hockey player
, Japanese character designer
, Japanese voice actor
, Japanese surgeon, medical scientist and educator
Akio Takamori (1950–2017), Japanese-American sculptor
Akio Tamashiro, Peruvian karateka
, president and CEO of Toyota Motor Corporation
, Japanese sumo wrestler
, Japanese long-distance runner
, Japanese animator
, Japanese composer
, Japanese classical composer
, Japanese footballer

Other people
, Japanese female lyricist
Jimmy Yang, American wrestler who used Akio as his ring name

Japanese masculine given names